Nitin Passi (born November 1982) is founder and owner of fashion retailer Missguided. According to The Sunday Times Rich List in 2019, he had a net worth of £250 million.

Early life 
Born in Cheshire, Passi grew up in Surrey and Hong Kong and briefly lived in New York. His grandfather moved to the UK from India in the 1960s and set up a knitwear factory.

Passi went to Cranleigh School and Newcastle University, where he studied business management.

After graduation, he worked for his father's fashion wholesaler.

Career 
In 2008, Passi founded Missguided from a factory in Prestwich, Greater Manchester, with a £50,000 loan from his dad, using £3,000 to set up the website and £5,000 to buy stock. He repaid the loan within 6 months.

Passi has said that the launch of the company was originally motivated by recognising the growth of online retail and the fewer fashion options available for younger women.

The company has partnered with a number of celebrities, including Nicole Scherzinger, Sofia Richie & most recently Sean John, and Passi credits the success of the brand to its use of celebrities and its ability to reach consumers via social media networks.

In 2016 and 2017, the brand opened physical retail outlets in Bluewater and Westfield Stratford City.

By 2018, the company revealed it has fallen into the red and was planning to make redundancies. In 2019, it was announced that Missguided would close its Westfield store.

In 2018, Passi was reprimanded for failing to appear at a Parliamentary Select Committee inquiry into sustainability and sending a colleague in his stead.

In April 2022, Passi stood down as CEO of Missguided.

Personal life 
Passi once owned a pink Lamborghini and calls himself a "fitness fanatic".

References

1982 births
Living people
British people of Indian descent
British chief executives